The Fecto Group is a Pakistani company which was founded in 1952 by Ghulam Mohammad A. Fecto.

It is currently engaged in Cement, Paper Sack, Particle board and Medium Density Fiberboard (MDF).

History
The group was founded by Ghulam Mohammad A. Fecto.  He was born in 1922 in Jetpur in the British Indian state of Gujarat, into a Memon family. He migrated from Mumbai to Dhaka in former East Pakistan and started a trading business dealing in electrical goods and home appliances, Radios and TVs, Wire & Cable and Automobiles. 
 
The business then transitioned into industrial activities in the western wing of Pakistan, where it secured the agency of tractors in 1975. In fact, the Group continued to transition and at different points manufactured with two Sugar Mills, a Tractor Plant, Cement Plant, two Paper Sack Units, Particle and MDF Board Plant.

In 1981, Fecto Cement Limited (PSX: FECTC) was established.

Major projects of the group 
 Fecto Sugar Mills Limited.  Bhakkar, Punjab
 Baba Farid Sugar Mills Limited.  Okara, Punjab
 Fecto Belarus Tractors (Private)  Limited.  Lahore, Punjab
 Fecto Cement Limited.  Sangjani, Punjab
 Frontier Paper Products (Private) Limited.  Hattar, Khyber Pakhtunkhwa
 Gadoon Paper Products (Private) Limited.  Gadoon, Khyber Pakhtunkhwa
 Fecto Boards (Private) Limited.  Darya Khan, District Bhakkar, Punjab

Export of products
Fecto Cement Limited's northern plant in Khyber Pakhtunkhwa supplies cement to Punjab, Khyber Pakhtunkhwa and Azad Kashmir areas in the domestic market.

References

External links
About Us- Fecto Group
The Morning Call
 Fecto Cement Polo Match on The Nation
Fecto Sugar Mills Ltd on Business Recorder
Fecto Belarus Tractors on Daily Times
Fecto Cement on D&B
Fect Cement on Wall Street Journal Markets
Pakistan Business Journal
Who Owns Pakistan

Conglomerate companies established in 1954
Conglomerate companies of Pakistan
Manufacturing companies based in Lahore
1954 establishments in Pakistan